James Assarasakorn (born July 3, 1993), known professionally as James Ma, is a Thai actor and model. He made an acting debut in 2013 in Gentlemen of Jutathep Series as M.R. Ronapee Jutathep. He is currently working under Channel 3.

Early life and education
Ma was born in Bangkok to a Thai Chinese father and a Hong Kong Teochew mother. He has one younger sister. Ma first attended NIST International School, but at the age of 8, his family moved to Hong Kong, where he resumed studying in Quarry Bay School. He then excelled 2 years past his usual studying year group and attended South Island School of Hong Kong. In late 2011, he was discovered by Supachai Srivijit, who then became his manager in the entertainment industry, and Ma returned to Thailand to study in Harrow International School, Bangkok. He received a bachelor’s degree of Arts in Business English and a master’s degree  of Business Administration in Tourism and Hospitality Management from Assumption University. Before Ma decided to be an actor, he thought about being a pro golfer. He won a gold medal in the ISSFHK Golf Pairs Championship 2008 in Hong Kong and many other awards against other schools. In 2008, he auditioned for The Star (season 7), a Thai reality show and singing competition, but didn't pass through the final audition.

Career
Ma made his acting debut at the age of 20 with a lead role in a special period drama Gentlemen of Jutathep Series in 2013. This special series made to celebrate ThaiTV3's 43rd anniversary, which assigned five top producers to each make a period drama about the five Jutathep brothers: Khun Chai Taratorn, Khun Chai Pawornruj, Khun Chai Phuttipat, Khun Chai Rachanon and Khun Chai Ronapee. His main series which is Khun Chai Ronapee is directed by Chatchai Plengpanich and he was acted with Chalida Vijitvongthong as female lead. This period drama is an adaptation from the novel of the same name. Before the drama aired, Ma was harshly criticized by netizen, saying that he lacked the looks and talent but he proved to everyone his talent when the drama aired.

Ma then starred in the short film titled Thai Niyom: Prince Pom in 2014. He plays as Prince Pom. This was his first performance in short film after debuting. On the same year, Ma participated in Give Me 5 Concert alongside Mario Maurer, Sukollawat Kanarot, Nadech Kugimiya and Phupoom Pongpanu. During his concert, he invited Tata Young and Boy Peacemaker as his special guest.

In 2015, Ma returned to TV screens, after a two-year absence, with a romance action drama The King's Servant directed by Atthaporn Teemakorn. This story takes place in the era of Rama III, the third king of Siam under the House of Chakri. The story sets around the period when Britain (known as Wilat at that time) enters into a commercial partnership role with Siam. He was paired opposite Peranee Kongthai in the series.

In the same year, Ma was cast as a lead role in Just a Man, Not a Magician with Kimberley Anne Woltemas. This drama is a remake of 2001 Samee Ngern Phon, and was produced by Ann Thongprasom and directed by Kritsada Techanilobon.

In late 2015, Ma made his movie debut as a lead role alongside South Korean actress Hahm Eun-jung in a sci-fi romance movie Microlove. This movie was directed by Sathanapong Limwongthong. It revolves around an outgoing and wealthy Thai man, who works in a Korean software company that privately develops a software and catches the interest of the president’s daughter.

Filmography

Film

Television series

Concerts
 Give Me 5 Concert with Mario Maurer, Sukollawat Kanarot, Nadech Kugimiya, Phupoom Pongpanu (2014)
 Channel 3 concert : Love is in the air (2017)

Awards and nominations

References

External links  
 
 
 
 

1993 births
Living people
James Ma
James Ma
James Ma
James Ma
James Ma
James Ma
James Ma
James Ma
James Ma